Daniele Luppi is an Italian composer and music producer who has been active since around 1999. He is an Emmy nominated film and television composer and has worked with the likes of The Red Hot Chili Peppers, Gnarls Barkley, and John Legend. 

As a film composer, Luppi has scored a number of productions including the Assassination of a High School President starring Bruce Willis, and the award-winning indie film Bad Habits. His work in television includes an “Outstanding Original Main Title Theme Music” Emmy nod for Netflix’s Marco Polo and STARZ’s Magic City. 

Beyond the scoring stage and in the studio, Luppi has put forward a string of releases that exemplify various eras of Italian music. His first album, An Italian Story paid homage to vintage 60s and 70s soundstage compositions and benefited from contributions by members of The Marc 4. Rome, the conceptual and spiritual follow-up to his debut album, was described as “purely gorgeous” by Pitchfork, seen as a foray into the mainstream and was praised for its collaborations with Jack White, Norah Jones, and Danger Mouse. MILANO, Luppi’s 2017 full-length album featuring accompaniment from Karen O and Parquet Courts, is the final volume of his Italian trilogy. Whereas his previous work called on a cinematic era in Italian music, MILANO examined the 1980s New York no wave and punk scene and its influence on Milanese music, fashion, and high-art and served as a finale acknowledging Italy’s famed arts and culture. 

Luppi has written collaborative arrangements for The Getaway by The Red Hot Chili Peppers, Gnarls Barkley’s debut St. Elsewhere, and the self-titled album from Broken Bells. He has also contributed string arrangements for Depeche Mode’s Dave Gahan, John Legend’s R&B album Once Again, and Faith No More/Mr. Bungle front man Mike Patton.

Discography

Associated acts

Filmography

Composer

Soundtrack

Television

Composer

Soundtrack

References

External links
 
 
 

Italian musicians
Italian record producers
Living people
1972 births
Ipecac Recordings artists
Italian music arrangers